This is a list of periodicals published in Rhodesia (today Zimbabwe). It includes periodicals published in Southern Rhodesia, before Rhodesia declared independence.

Academic journals

Magazines

References 
Rhodesia, List of academic journals published in
Mass media in Rhodesia
Academia in Rhodesia
English-language journals